The Siletz River flows about  to the Pacific Ocean through coastal mountains in the U.S. state of Oregon. Formed by the confluence of its north and south forks near Valsetz in Polk County, it winds through the Central Oregon Coast Range.

Course
The river begins slightly east of the Polk–Lincoln county border in the Siuslaw National Forest of the Central Oregon Coast Range. Blind Creek enters from the left about  further on. Flowing generally southwest, the river receives Elk and then Holman creeks from the right, Sunshine Creek from the left, Buck Creek from the right, followed by Wolfer Creek from the left at about river mile (RM) 57 or river kilometer (RK) 92. About  later, the river turns west and soon receives Wildcat Creek from the right. For parts of its course along its upper reaches, the river flows near non-contiguous parcels of land belonging to the Siletz Reservation.

Passing under Rock Creek Road and receiving Rock Creek from the left, the river turns west again and soon receives Scott Creek from the right, Sam Creek from the left, and Bentilla and Baker creeks, both from the right. Continuing south and then west parallel to Upper Siletz Road, the river passes a United States Geological Survey (USGS) stream gauge and reaches Siletz at about RM 41 (RK 66). At Siletz, the river receives Mill and Dewey creeks from the left. Following a series of meanders that carry it under Oregon Route 229 twice and almost completely around the city of Siletz, the river heads north, roughly parallel to Route 229, which runs near it all the way to Siletz Bay. In the next stretch, the river receives Tangerman, Spencer. and Thompson creeks, all from the right.

Meandering north, then east, then north again, the Siletz receives Euchre Creek and Reed creeks from the right. After another sharp turn to the west  from the mouth, the river flows by Jack Morgan County Park and receives Chitwood, Hough, and Wade creeks, all from the right. Cedar and Misac creeks then enter from the right, Jaybird Creek from the left, and,  from the mouth, Roy Creek from the left. Over the next , the river again doubles back on itself, flowing west, then north, then east until it is near Roy Creek again, then turns north. It receives Roots, Skalada, Townsend, and Stemple creeks in quick succession, all from the right, near RM 15 (RK 24). Shortly thereafter, Scare Creek enters from the left.

Turning north and then west again, the river over the next  receives Bear, Skunk, Barhaven, and Anderson creeks, all from the right. A distributary, Millport Slough, branches to the left from the main stem as the river nears Siletz Bay and the Siletz Bay National Wildlife Refuge. The river reaches Kernville, passes under U.S. Route 101 and enters the bay.

Discharge
Tides affect the flow along the last  of the river.

Fishing
The river has been described as "a fine all-around stream" with good accessibility. Sport fish include fall chinook salmon, summer and winter steelhead, and coastal cutthroat trout. Fishing by boat is most common between Moonshine Park and Jack Morgan Park. The city of Siletz has a boat ramp, parking, and a picnic area along the river, and the lower river and bay have many moorages offering boats and fishing equipment.

See also
 List of rivers of Oregon
 List of longest streams of Oregon

References

Rivers of Oregon
Rivers of Lincoln County, Oregon
Rivers of Polk County, Oregon
Oregon placenames of Native American origin